Kambalakkad is one of the big towns near Kalpetta in the Wayanad district, Kerala, India.

Kambalakkad Mosque
The Juma Masjidh at Kambalakkad is an architectural splendor and the main landmark of the town. There are many murals in this masjidh.  The mosque is located in the very middle of the town. This majid is designed by Ar. Naseer of Prakriti Architects, calicut, one of the best Architectural firm in south India.Thr mosque brings out a vibrant looks for the city.

Ansariya Educational Complex

Ansariya Kambalakkad is an educational complex in Kaniyambetta Panchayath, Wayanad.  It is located in the heart of  Kambalakkad.  It includes a school, Ansariya public school, secondary madrassa, conference hall and a woman's college.  Ansariya public school is one of the most important public schools in Kerala.  It is regulated by the Kambalakkad South Madrassa Committee (KSMC).  It includes a school, madrassa, hall, and a +2 school.

Transportation
Kambalakkad is between Mananthavady and Kalpetta.  The Periya ghat road connects Mananthavady to Kannur and Thalassery.  The Thamarassery mountain road connects Calicut with Kalpetta. The Kuttiady mountain road connects Vatakara with Kalpetta and Mananthavady. The Palchuram mountain road connects Kannur and Iritty with Mananthavady.  The road from Nilambur to Ooty is also connected to Wayanad through the village of Meppadi.

The nearest ground transportation, a railway station, is at Kozhikode.  The town is 85 km away and the nearest airport is Kannur International Airport, which is 90 km away.

References

Villages in Wayanad district
Mananthavady Area
Kalpetta area